Sir Edward Herbert Bunbury, 9th Baronet (8 July 1811 – 5 March 1895), known as Edward Bunbury until 1886, was an English Barrister and a British Liberal Party politician.

Biography
Bunbury was the second son of Sir Henry Bunbury, 7th Baronet, and the grandson of Henry Bunbury; his mother was Louisa Emilia Fox, daughter of Henry Edward Fox. He was educated at Trinity College, Cambridge. He was called to the bar by the Inner Temple in 1841.

In 1847 Bunbury was elected to the House of Commons for Bury St Edmunds, a seat he held until 1852. In 1886, he succeeded his elder brother in the baronetcy.

Bunbury died of pneumonia in March 1895, aged 83. He never married and was succeeded in the baronetcy by his nephew, Charles.

Work

Bunbury's two-volume history of ancient geography published in 1879 is the first modern work in English which treats the textual sources with any sophistication.
  
He was also a contributing author to the Dictionary of Greek and Roman Geography (1854–57), and to a number of other reference works. Samuel Sharpe thought Bunbury had plagiarised his work on the Ptolemies.

Notes

References

Further reading
Kidd, Charles, Williamson, David (editors). Debrett's Peerage and Baronetage (1990 edition). New York: St Martin's Press, 1990,

External links 
 
 

1811 births
1895 deaths
Alumni of Trinity College, Cambridge
Baronets in the Baronetage of England
Edward
Liberal Party (UK) MPs for English constituencies
UK MPs 1847–1852
Members of the Inner Temple
Deaths from pneumonia in the United Kingdom